Norma Lee Daniels (July 6, 1930–September 13, 2008) was an American politician who served as a Democrat in the Kansas State Senate from 1981 to 1993.

Daniels was raised in Kansas City, Missouri, and graduated from high school and nursing school there. After graduation, she worked as an obstetrics nurse, married in 1954, and raised children. In 1976, she successfully ran for the Valley Center city council, serving there for six years. She successfully won election to the Kansas Senate in 1980, serving three terms. She decided to retire from the legislature in 1992, and Christine Downey succeeded her.

In addition to her political work, Daniels was a practicing Roman Catholic and volunteered to teach CCD. She died in Wichita in 2008.

References

1930 births
2008 deaths
Democratic Party Kansas state senators
20th-century American politicians
20th-century American women politicians
Women state legislators in Kansas
People from Sedgwick County, Kansas
Catholics from Kansas